Manitoba Provincial Road 311 (PR 311) is a provincial road in Manitoba, Canada.  Most of the highway is within the Rural Municipality of Hanover.

Route description
PR 311 begins at PR 200 in the R.M. of Ritchot and runs a short distance east to the town of Niverville.  After passing through the town, it enters the R.M. of Hanover and continues eastward, intersecting with PTH 59, PR 216, and PR 206.  At Blumenort, it meets PTH 12 and turns south, beginning a three kilometre concurrence between the two, after which PR 311 turns east again.  It enters into the R.M. of Ste. Anne and continues east until it reaches PR 210 at Giroux.  After crossing PR 210, PR 311 becomes a gravel road and continues a short distance further before ending at PR 302.

Manitoba Infrastructure classifies PR 311 between PTH 59 and Niverville as an RTAC route, which allows full truck and trailer access to the town.

PR 311's junction with PTH 59 is known to area residents for having a high number of vehicle collisions, prompting the addition of traffic lights and reduced speed zone at that intersection in 2015.

References

External links
Official Manitoba Highway Map

311